Barber's Point Light or Barbers Point Light may refer to:
Barbers Point Light (Hawaii) on Oahu
Barber's Point Light (New York) on Lake Champlain